Ruth Leslie Goodman (born 1961), who uses the pen name Meagan McKinney, is an American writer of twenty romance novels.

Education 
Goodman studied biology at Columbia University.

Career 
Goodman's career began as a biologist for several years. Goodman became a writer professionally and used the pen name Meagan McKinney.

Goodman's first book, My Wicked Enchantress, was a finalist for a Romance Writers of America Golden Medallion.

Personal life 
Goodman is divorced and resides with her two children in New Orleans, Louisiana. In November 2010, Goodman pleaded guilty to defrauding FEMA in the wake of Hurricane Katrina. She was sentenced to 3 years in prison.

Works 
source:

Single novels

Van Alen Family Saga series

Matched in Montana series

Anthologies in collaboration
The Monk in DANCE WITH THE DEVIL, published October 1997, along with Rexanne Becnel, Anne Logan and Deborah Martin.

References

Notes

External links 
 Meagan McKinney at goodreads.com
 Meagan McKinney at openlibrary.org
 Meagan McKinney at fictiondb.com

1961 births
Living people
American romantic fiction writers
American women novelists
Women romantic fiction writers
Writers from New Orleans
20th-century American novelists
20th-century American women writers
21st-century American novelists
21st-century American women writers
Novelists from Louisiana